Imago Records (The Imago Recording Company) was an American independent record label, which was active during the early 1990s. It was started by Terry Ellis after he left his previous record label, Chrysalis Records.

In 1990 Ann Munday was hired as Vice President and General Manager in their New York office.

Several influential artists released albums through Imago, including Rollins Band, Aimee Mann, Paula Cole and Love Spit Love. Despite building a slate of up and coming alternative rock artists, the company ran into serious financial difficulties when, in December 1994, the company's former financial backer Bertelsmann Music Group pulled funding. This left many of their artists scrambling to find new labels.

In 1996, Henry Rollins and his new label DreamWorks SKG sued Imago, alleging "fraud, deceit, undue influence and economic coercion" on the label's part.

Artists 

All of the following artists released albums on the Imago label:

Baby Animals
Basehead
Captain Hollywood Project
Paula Cole
Doctor Rain
Dread Zeppelin
Eden
Maggie Estep
The Figgs
Giant Sand
Great White
King of Fools
Love Spit Love
Aimee Mann
Kylie Minogue
Orangutang
Pere Ubu
Plan B
Rollins Band
Nikolaj Steen
John Waite
Bone Club
The Sextants

References 

American independent record labels
Defunct record labels of the United States